Qhapaqa (Aymara for king or sir; rich, also spelled Capaja) is a  mountain in the Bolivian Andes. It is located in the La Paz Department, Aroma Province, Sica Sica Municipality, southwest of Ayamaya.

References 

Mountains of La Paz Department (Bolivia)